Rohan Welsh (born 7 October 1970) is a former Australian rules footballer who played for Carlton in the Australian Football League (AFL) and Dandenong and Frankston in the Victorian Football League (VFL). He currently serves as the backline coach of the St Kilda Football Club.

Welsh was recruited to the AFL originally by Essendon but despite serving his apprenticeship in the under-19s and spending two years on their senior list, he couldn't break into Essendon's league side. After being released in 1990, he headed to Dandenong where he had success at full-forward. In 1991, he was the Victorian Football Association's leading goalkicker with 84 goals, won the VFA Mark of the Year (he was a regular flier for speckies), and he was part of the club's premiership team – he kicked four goals in the Grand Final, despite suffering a concussion in the third quarter and not remembering much of the second half.

As one of Carlton's forward targets, Welsh kicked 28 goals in 1992, six of them against Fitzroy in round 14. He played at a forward pocket in the 1993 AFL Grand Final where he kicked two goals in a losing cause.

In an end of season trip, Welsh injured himself when he fell off a fence during a night of celebrating and badly injured his knee. He was out of action for two years but was kept on Carlton's list and returned in 1996. His comeback was not all that successful and he was delisted at the end of the 1997 AFL season.

Until his retirement in 2000, Welsh played with VFL club Frankston. He then turned to coaching and was an assistant coach with the Calder Cannons from 2002 to 2004. After leaving Calder he took up the job of the Oakleigh Chargers' senior coach and steered them to the 2006 TAC Cup premiership.

References

Holmesby, Russell and Main, Jim (2007). The Encyclopedia of AFL Footballers. 7th ed. Melbourne: Bas Publishing.

1970 births
Living people
Australian rules footballers from Victoria (Australia)
Carlton Football Club players
Dandenong Football Club players
Frankston Football Club players
Casey Demons coaches
People educated at St. Bernard's College, Melbourne